The Face in the Dark is a 1918 American silent mystery film directed by Hobart Henley and starring Mae Marsh, Niles Welch and Alec B. Francis. The film's sets were designed by the art director Hugo Ballin.

Cast
 Mae Marsh as Jane Ridgeway 
 Niles Welch as Richard Grant 
 Alec B. Francis as Charles Ridgeway 
 Harry Myers as Jim Weaver 
 Donald Hall as Nixon 
 Joseph W. Smiley as CharlesHammond 
 Isabel Lamon as Rosalind Hammond 
 Alice Wilson as Mrs. Hammond

References

Bibliography
 Ken Wlaschin. Silent Mystery and Detective Movies: A Comprehensive Filmography. McFarland, 2009.

External links
 

1918 films
1918 mystery films
American silent feature films
American mystery films
American black-and-white films
Goldwyn Pictures films
Films directed by Hobart Henley
1910s English-language films
1910s American films
Silent mystery films